was a town located in Gamō District, Shiga, Japan.

As of 2003, the town had an estimated population of 14,710 and a density of 424.65 persons per km2. The total area was 34.64 km2.

On January 1, 2006, Gamō, along with the town of Notogawa (from Kanzaki District), was merged into the expanded city of Higashiōmi.

Sister city 
 Buyeo-gun Jangam, Chungcheongnam-do, South Korea

External links
Higashiōmi official website

Dissolved municipalities of Shiga Prefecture